Louis Buisseret (1888 - 1956) was a Belgian painter, draftsman and engraver. His style of art mainly focused on realistic portraits, nudes, and still life. Works by Buisseret can be found in museums in Belgium, Barcelona, Madrid, Riga, and Indianapolis.

Biography 
Buisseret was born in Binche, Hainault, Belgian in 1888. His parent had encouraged him to study art when he was a child. At age 16, Buisseret studied engraving at the Art Academy of Bergen  under Louis Joseph Greuse. In 1908, he studied at the Royal Academy of Fine Arts in Brussels  under Jean Delville, a mentor who heavily influenced Buisseret’s later work. After completing the training at Brussel Academy, Bruisseret traveled to Italy with his father to study the works of Italian artists of the Quattrocento and Cinquecento.

In 1920, Buisseret actively participated in leading salons and gallery exhibits in Belgium. In 1922, Buisseret married Emilie Empain, who often acted as a model for him. Buisseret's work was exhibited at the Carnegie Institute, Pittsburgh in 1926. In 1928, Buisseret’s work was rejected by the Salon of La Louviere for its obscene character. This incident led to the establishment of Nervia, a group of artists, by Buisseret, Anto Carte, and Leon Eeckman, who supported promising young artists.

In 1929, Bruisseret was appointed as director of the Art Academy of Bergen, where he held the position for 20 years.

Auction 
Buisseret's work has been offered at auction multiple times. The record price for Buisseret at auction is $17,795 USD for an artwork titled Portrait of Mrs Homer Saint-Gaudens sold in 2008.

Awards 
 1910, second prize in the Belgian Prix de Rome painting competition
 1911, first prize in the Belgian Prix de Rome engraving competition 
 1929, silver medal at the Salon of Barcelona

Footnotes

References 

1888 births
1956 deaths
20th-century Belgian painters
Académie Royale des Beaux-Arts alumni
Academic staff of the Académie Royale des Beaux-Arts